Old Prussian was a Western Baltic language belonging to the Baltic branch of the Indo-European languages, which was once spoken by the Old Prussians, the Baltic peoples of the Prussian region. The language is called Old Prussian to avoid confusion with the German dialects of Low Prussian and High Prussian and with the adjective Prussian as it relates to the later German state. Old Prussian began to be written down in the Latin alphabet in about the 13th century, and a small amount of literature in the language survives.

Classification and relation to other languages
Old Prussian is an Indo-European language belonging to the Baltic branch. It is considered to be a Western Baltic language.

Old Prussian was closely related to the other extinct Western Baltic languages, namely Sudovian, West Galindian and possibly Skalvian and Old Curonian. Other linguists consider Western Galindian and Skalvian to be Prussian dialects.

It is related to the Eastern Baltic languages such as Lithuanian and Latvian, and more distantly related to Slavic.

Old Prussian had loanwords from Slavic languages (e.g., Old Prussian  'hound', like Lithuanian  and Latvian , cognate with Slavic (compare , ;)), as well as a few borrowings from Germanic, including from Gothic (e.g., Old Prussian  'awl' as with Lithuanian , Latvian ) and from Scandinavian languages.

Influence on other languages

German
The Germanic regional dialect of Low German spoken in Prussia (or East Prussia), called Low Prussian (cf.

Polish
One of the hypotheses regarding the origin of  – a phonological merger of dentialveolar and postalveolar sibilants in many Polish dialects – states that it originated as a feature of Polonized Old Prussians in Masuria (see Masurian dialect) and spread from there.

History

Original territory

In addition to Prussia proper, the original territory of the Old Prussians may have included eastern parts of Pomerelia (some parts of the region east of the Vistula River). The language may also have been spoken much further east and south in what became Polesia and part of Podlasie, before conquests by Rus and Poles starting in the 10th century and the German colonisation of the area starting in the 12th century.

Decline
With the conquest of the Old Prussian territory by the Teutonic Knights in the 13th century, and the subsequent influx of Polish, Lithuanian and especially German speakers, Old Prussian experienced a 400-year-long decline as an "oppressed language of an oppressed population". Groups of people from Germany, Poland, Lithuania, Scotland, England, and Austria (see Salzburg Protestants) found refuge in Prussia during the Protestant Reformation and thereafter. Old Prussian ceased to be spoken probably around the beginning of the 18th century, because many of its remaining speakers died in the famines and the bubonic plague outbreak which harrowed the East Prussian countryside and towns from 1709 until 1711.

Revitalization

In the 1980s, Soviet linguists Vladimir Toporov and Vytautas Mažiulis started reconstructing the Prussian language as a scientific project and a humanitarian gesture. Some enthusiasts thereafter began to revive the language based on their reconstruction.

Most current speakers live in Germany, Poland, Lithuania and Kaliningrad (Russia). Additionally, a few children are native in Revived Prussian.

Today, there are websites, online dictionaries, learing apps and games for Revived Prussian, and one children's book – Antoine de Saint-Exupéry's The Little Prince – was translated into Revived Prussian by Piotr Szatkowski (Pīteris Šātkis) and published by the Prusaspirā Society in 2015. Moreover, some bands use Revived Prussian, most notably in the Kaliningrad Oblast by the bands Romowe Rikoito, Kellan and Āustras Laīwan, as well as in Lithuania by Kūlgrinda on their 2005 album  ('Prussian Hymns'), and Latvia by Rasa Ensemble in 1988 and Valdis Muktupāvels in his 2005 oratorio "Pārcēlātājs Pontifex" featuring several parts sung in Prussian.

Dialects
The Elbing Vocabulary and the Catechisms display systematical differences in phonology, vocabulary and grammar. Some scholars postulate that this is due to them being recordings of different dialects:
Pomesanian and Sambian.

Phonetical distinctions are: Pom. ē is Samb. ī ( 'world'); Pom. ō, Samb. ū after a labial ( 'mother') or Pom. ō, Samb. ā ( 'father';  'brother'), which influences the nominative suffixes of feminine ā-stems ( 'blood'). The nominative suffixes of the masculine o-stems are weakened to -is in Pomesanian; in Sambian they are syncopated ( 'god').

Vocabulary differences encompass Pom. , Samb.  'man'; Pom. , Samb.  'son' and Pom. , Samb.  'field'.
The neuter gender is more often found in Pomesianan than in Sambian.

Others argue that the Catechisms are written in a Yatvingized Prussian. The differences noted above could therefore be explained as being features of a different West Baltic language Yatvingian/Sudovian.

Phonology

Consonants
The Prussian language is described to have the following consonants:

Whether or not the palatalization was phonemical remains unclear.

Apart from the palatalizations Proto-Baltic consonants were almost completely preserved. The only changes postulated are turning Proto-Baltic  into Prussian  and subsequently changing Proto-Baltic  into .

Vowels
The following description is based on the phonological analysis by Schmalstieg:

  could also have been realized as 
  is not universally accepted, p.e. by Levin (1975)

Diphthongs
Schmalstieg proposes three native diphthongs:

  may have also been realized as a mid-back diphthong  after palatalized consonants.
  occurs in the word , which is thought to be a loanword.

Grammar
With other remains being merely word lists, the grammar of Old Prussian is reconstructed chiefly on the basis of the three Catechisms.

Nouns

Gender
Old Prussian preserved the Proto-Baltic neuter. Therefore, it had three genders (masculine, feminine, neuter).

Number
Most scholars agree that there are two numbers, singular and plural, in Old Prussian, while some consider rests of a dual identifiable in the existent corpus.

Cases
There is no consensus on the number of cases that Old Prussian had, and at least four can be determined with certainty: nominative, genitive, accusative and dative, with different suffixes. Most scholars agree, that there are traces of a vocative case, such as in the phrase  'O God the Lord', reflecting the inherited PIE vocative ending *, differing from nominative forms in o-stem nouns only.

Some scholars find instrumental forms, while the traditional view is that no instrumental case existed in Old Prussian. There could be some locative forms, e.g.  ('in the evening').

Noun stems
Declensional classes were a-stems (also called o-stems), (i)ja-stems (also called (i)jo-stems), ā-stems (feminine), ē-stems (feminine), i-stems, u-stems, and consonant-stems. Some also list ī/jā-stems as a separate stem, while others include jā-stems into ā-stems and do not mention ī-stems at all.

Adjectives
There were three adjective stems (a-stems, i-stems, u-stems), of which only the first agreed with the noun in gender.

There was a comparative and a superlative form.

Verbal morphology
When it comes to verbal morphology present, future and past tense are attested, as well as optative forms (used with imperative or permissive forms of verbs), infinitive, and four participles (active/passive present/past).

Orthography
The orthography varies depending on the author.
As the authors of many sources were themselves not proficient in Old Prussian, they wrote the words as they heard them using the orthographical conventions of their mother tongue. 
Additionally, the writers misunderstood some phonemes and, when copying manuscripts, they added further mistakes.

Corpus of Old Prussian

Onomastics
There was Prussian toponomy and hydronomy within the territory of (Baltic) Prussia.

Another source are personal names.

Evidence from other languages
Further sources for Prussian words are Vernacularisms in the German dialects of East and West Prussia, as well as words of Old Curonian origin in Latvian and West-Baltic vernacularisms in Lithuanian and Belorussian.

Vocabularies
Two Prussian vocabularies are known. The older one by Simon Grunau (Simon Grunovius), a historian of the Teutonic Knights, encompasses 100 words (in strongly varying versions). He also recorded an expression:  ('This (is) our lord, our lord'). The vocabulary is part of the  written .

The second one is the so-called Elbing Vocabulary, which consists of 802 thematically sorted words and their German equivalents. Peter Holcwesscher from Marienburg copied the manuscript around 1400; the original dates from the beginning of the 14th or the end of the 13th century.

Fragmentary Texts
There are separate words found in various historical documents.

The following fragments are commonly thought of as Prussian, but are probably actually Lithuanian (at least the adage, however, has been argued to be genuinely West Baltic, only an otherwise unattested dialect):
 An adage of 1583, : the form  in the second instance corresponds to Lithuanian future tense  ('will give')
  ('Strike! Strike!')

Fragmentary Lord's Prayer

Maletius' Sudovian book
Vytautas Mažiulis lists another few fragmentary texts recorded in several versions by Hieronymus Maletius in the Sudovian book in the middle of the 16th century. Palmaitis regards them as Sudovian proper.
 ('Run, run, devils!')
 ('Hello our friend!')
 ('A carter drives here, a carter drives here!')

Complete Texts
In addition to the texts listed beneath, there several colophons written by Prussian scriptors who worked in Prague and in the court of Lithuanian duke Butautas Kęstutaitis.

Basel Epigram
The so-called Basel Epigram is the oldest written Prussian sentence (1369). It reads: 
This jocular inscription was most probably made by a Prussian student studying in Prague (Charles University); found by Stephen McCluskey (1974) in manuscript MS F.V.2 (book of physics  by Nicholas Oresme), fol. 63r, stored in the Basel University library.

Catechisms
The first two consist of only six pages of text in Old Prussian – the second one being a correction of the first. The third catechism, or Enchiridion, consists of 132 pages of text, and is a translation of Luther's Small Catechism by a German cleric called Abel Will, with his Prussian assistant Paul Megott. Will himself knew little or no Old Prussian, and his Prussian interpreter was probably illiterate, but according to Will spoke Old Prussian quite well. The text itself is mainly a word-for-word translation, and Will phonetically recorded Megott's oral translation. Because of this, the Enchiridion exhibits many irregularities, such as the lack of case agreement in phrases involving an article and a noun, which followed word-for-word German originals as opposed to native Old Prussian syntax.

Trace of Crete
The "Trace of Crete" is a short poem added by a Baltic writer in Chania to a manuscript of the  Logica Parva by Paul of Venice.

Sample texts

Lord's Prayer in Old Prussian (from the so-called "1st Catechism")

Lord's Prayer after Simon Grunau (Curonian)

Lord's Prayer after Prätorius (Curonian)

Lord's Prayer in Lithuanian dialect of Insterburg (Prediger Hennig)

Lord's Prayer in Lithuanian dialect of Nadruvia, corrupted (Simon Praetorius)

See also
 High Prussian dialect
 Low Prussian dialect
 Masurian dialect

Notes

References

Literature
 J. S. Vater: Mithridates oder allgemeine Sprachenkunde mit dem Vater Unser als Sprachprobe, Berlin 1809
 J. S. Vater: Die Sprache der alten Preußen Wörterbuch Prußisch–Deutsch, Katechismus, Braunschweig 1821/Wiesbaden 1966
 G. H. F. Nesselmann, Forschungen auf dem Gebiete der preußischen Sprache, 2. Beitrag: Königsberg, 1871.
 G. H. F. Nesselmann, Thesaurus linguae Prussicae, Berlin, 1873.
 E. Berneker, Die preussische Sprache, Strassburg, 1896.
 R. Trautmann, Die altpreussischen Sprachdenkmäler, Göttingen, 1910.
 Wijk, Nicolaas van, Altpreussiche Studien : Beiträge zur baltischen und zur vergleichenden indogermanischen Grammatik, Haag, 1918.
 G. Gerullis, Die altpreussischen Ortsnamen, Berlin-Leipzig, 1922.
 R. Trautmann, Die altpreussischen Personnennamen, Göttingen, 1925.
 G. Gerullis, Zur Sprache der Sudauer-Jadwinger, in Festschrift A. Bezzenberger, Göttingen 1927
 W. R. Schmalstieg, An Old Prussian Grammar, University Park and London, 1974.
 W. R. Schmalstieg, Studies in Old Prussian, University Park and London, 1976.
 V. Toporov, Prusskij jazyk: Slovar', A – L, Moskva, 1975–1990 (not finished).
 L. Kilian: Zu Herkunft und Sprache der Prußen Wörterbuch Deutsch–Prußisch, Bonn 1980
 (In Lithuanian) V. Mažiulis, Prūsų kalbos paminklai, Vilnius, t. I 1966, t. II 1981.
 J. Endzelīns, Senprūšu valoda. – Gr. Darbu izlase, IV sēj., 2. daļa, Rīga, 1982. 9.-351. lpp.
 V. Mažiulis, Prūsų kalbos etimologijos žodynas, Vilnius, t. I-IV, 1988–1997.
 M. Biolik, Zuflüsse zur Ostsee zwischen unterer Weichsel und Pregel, Stuttgart, 1989.
 R. Przybytek, Ortsnamen baltischer Herkunft im südlichen Teil Ostpreussens, Stuttgart, 1993.
 R. Przybytek, Hydronymia Europaea, Ortsnamen baltischer Herkunft im südlichen Teil Ostpreußens, Stuttgart 1993
 M. Biolik, Die Namen der stehenden Gewässer im Zuflussgebiet des Pregel, Stuttgart, 1993.
 M. Biolik, Die Namen der fließenden Gewässer im Flussgebiet des Pregel, Stuttgart, 1996.
 G. Blažienė, Die baltischen Ortsnamen in Samland, Stuttgart, 2000.
 A. Kaukienė, Prūsų kalba, Klaipėda, 2002.
 V. Mažiulis, Prūsų kalbos istorinė gramatika, Vilnius, 2004.
 LEXICON BORVSSICVM VETVS. Concordantia et lexicon inversum. / Bibliotheca Klossiana I, Universitas Vytauti Magni, Kaunas, 2007.
 OLD PRUSSIAN WRITTEN MONUMENTS. Facsimile, Transliteration, Reconstruction, Comments. / Bibliotheca Klossiana II, Universitas Vytauti Magni / Lithuanians' World Center, Kaunas, 2007.
 (In Lithuanian) V. Rinkevičius, Prūsistikos pagrindai (Fundamentals of Prussistics). 2015.

External links

 Database of the Old Prussian Linguistic Heritage (Etymological Dictionary of Old Prussian (in Lithuanian) and full textual corpus)
 Frederik Kortlandt: Electronic text editions (contains transcriptions of Old Prussian manuscript texts)
 M. Gimbutas Map Western Balts-Old Prussians
 Vocabulary by a friar Simon Grunau
 Elbing Vocabulary

Prussian language, Old
Prussian language, Old
Culture of Prussia
Extinct Baltic languages
Extinct languages of Europe
Language revival
Languages extinct in the 18th century
Old-Prussian language

eo:Praprusoj#Kristanigo kaj la praprusa lingvo